Hucisko  is a village in the administrative district of Gmina Stryszawa, within Sucha County, Lesser Poland Voivodeship, in southern Poland.

The village has a population of 350.

References

Hucisko